Essie Pinola Parrish (1902–1979), was a Kashaya Pomo spiritual leader and exponent of native traditions. She was also a notable basket weaver.

Biography 
Parrish was born Essie Pinola in 1902 at the Stewarts Point Rancheria in Stewarts Point, California. At the age of 6, she was recognized as a shaman by the Kashaya and eventually became the spiritual leader of the Kashaya community. She was considered a prophet and a skilled interpreter of dreams.

Parrish was also a healer and a teacher. Parrish educated Kashaya (Kashia) children in the Kashaya Pomo language. She collaborated with Robert Oswalt, a linguist at University of California, Berkeley, to write a dictionary of Kashaya Pomo. Her work on Kashaya Pomo is in the California Language Archive. She helped create over 20 anthropological films documenting Pomo culture. She lectured at the New School in New York City in 1972.

Parrish was well known for her expertise in basket weaving. Robert F. Kennedy was among her collectors.

See also
 List of Native American artists
 Visual arts by indigenous peoples of the Americas

References

External links
 Redwood bark dolls made by Essie Pinola Parrish
 Pomo Dreamers and Doctors, includes photos of Essie Parrish
 
 

1902 births
1979 deaths
Female Native American leaders
Native American basket weavers
Pomo people
Religious figures of the indigenous peoples of North America
20th-century American women artists
Native American women artists
Women basketweavers
20th-century Native Americans
20th-century Native American women